Ogyris oroetes, the silky azure, is a butterfly in the family Lycaenidae. It is found in most of mainland Australia.

The wingspan is 30–40 mm. Adults of both sexes are metallic blue, but only the females have black margins. The underside of the forewings blotchy fawn.

The larvae feed on Loranthaceae species, including Amyena miquelii, Amyema bifurcatum and Amyema pendulum. They are grey and often flat with few markings. The larvae are attended by various species of ants. Pupation takes place under loose bark or in ground debris.

Subspecies
 Ogyris oroetes oroetes (Queensland to New South Wales and Western Australia)
 Ogyris oroetes apiculata Quick, 1972 (Western Australia)

References

Butterflies described in 1862
Arhopalini